María José Llergo (born 1994) is a Spanish singer.

Biography 
Born in Pozoblanco, in 1994, she joined the local violin school at a young age. Owing to being granted a musical scholarship, she moved to Barcelona when she was 19 years old, continuing her musical education, starting a professional career as a singer. Her first single was "Niña de las dunas" (2018), performing alongside guitarist Marc López. After the release of several songs such as  "Nana del Mediterráneo" or "Me miras pero no ves", she published her first EP, Sanación, in 2020.
In 2022, she won a Goya award for her song "Te Espera El Mar", which formed part of the soundtrack for the Spanish film Mediterráneo. In June, it was announced that she would collaborate with Zahara for her reissue "REPUTA". The song was released on September 23, alongside the album's release.

Discography

EPs

• Sanación (2020)

Singles

• Niña de las Dunas (2017)

• Me Miras Pero No Me Ves (2019)

• Nana del Mediterráneo (2019)

• Nana de los Rosales (feat. Paquete) (2019)

• El Péndulo (2019)

• El Hombre de las Mil Lunas (2020)

• ¿De Qué Me Sirve Llorar? (2020)

• Soy Como El Oro (2020)

• Pena, Penita, Pena (Lola Flores cover) (2020)

• A Través De Ti (2020)

• La Luz (with Didi Gutman, $hyhook) (2020)

• Que Tú Me Quieras (2021)

• Te Espera El Mar (2021)

• SANSA (REPUTA) (Zahara feat. María José Llergo) (2022)

Awards and nominations

References 

1994 births
21st-century Spanish women singers
21st-century Spanish singers
Living people
Singers from Andalusia
People from the Province of Córdoba (Spain)